Grégoire Coudert (born 3 April 1999) is a French professional footballer who plays as a goalkeeper for  club Brest.

Club career
Coudert signed a professional intern contract with Tours on 23 June 2017. He made his first team debut for the club in a 2–1 Ligue 2 loss to Nancy on 8 December 2017. He moved to Amiens in the summer of 2019, and signed his first senior professional contract on 29 June 2020.

On 5 July 2021, Coudert signed a one-year contract with Brest.

References

External links
 
 LFP Profile
 

1999 births
Living people
People from Rodez
Sportspeople from Aveyron
Association football goalkeepers
French footballers
Tours FC players
Amiens SC players
Stade Brestois 29 players
Ligue 2 players
Championnat National players
Footballers from Occitania (administrative region)